The Highest Science and Technology Award also known as the State Preeminent Science and Technology Award, State Supreme Science and Technology Award, or China's Nobel Prize is the highest scientific award issued by the President of the PRC to scientists working in China. The award, given annually each January since 2000, is one of the five State Science and Technology Prizes established by the State Council of the People's Republic of China.

The award comes with a prize of 8 million RMB (about 1.16 million USD), with 10% of this awarded as a bonus to the scientist and the remainder awarded to support the scientist's research.

Award winners 
2000
Yuan Longping - agriculturist
Wu Wenjun - mathematician

2001
Wang Xuan - computer scientist
Huang Kun - physicist

2002
Jin Yilian - computer scientist

2003
Liu Dongsheng - geologist
Wang Yongzhi - aerospace scientist

2004
Not awarded

2005
Ye Duzheng - meteorologist
Wu Mengchao - hepatobiliary surgery scientist and surgeon

2006
Li Zhensheng - plant geneticist

2007
Min Enze - petrochemical engineer
Wu Zhengyi - biologist

2008
Wang Zhongcheng - neurologist
Xu Guangxian - chemist

2009
Gu Chaohao - mathematician
Sun Jiadong - satellite engineer

2010
Shi Changxu - material scientist
Wang Zhenyi - pathophysiologist

2011
Xie Jialin - physicist
Wu Liangyong - architect

2012
Zheng Zhemin - physicist
Wang Xiaomo - radar engineer

2013
Zhang Cunhao - physical chemist
Cheng Kaijia - nuclear physicist

2014
Yu Min - nuclear physicist

2015
Not awarded

2016
Zhao Zhongxian - physicist
Tu Youyou - pharmaceutical chemist

2017
Wang Zeshan - explosives specialist
Hou Yunde - virologist

2018
Liu Yongtan - radar technology and signal processing expert
Qian Qihu - military protection engineering expert

2019
Huang Xuhua - nuclear submarine engineer
Zeng Qingcun - meteorologist

2020 

 Gu Songfen - aerodynamicist
 Wang Dazhong - nuclear reactor engineer

See also 

 List of general science and technology awards 
 State Science and Technology Prizes

References 

Orders, decorations, and medals of the People's Republic of China
People's Republic of China science and technology awards
Awards established in 2000
2000 establishments in China
Chinese Academy of Sciences
China-related lists
Chinese awards
Academic awards in China